Yangaulovo (Yañawıl) is a rural locality (a selo) in Akbarisovsky Selsoviet, Sharansky District, Bashkortostan, Russia. The population was 204 as of 2010. There are 2 street.

Geography 
Yangaulovo is located 19 km northeast of Sharan (the district's administrative centre) by road. Novotavlarovo is the nearest rural locality.

References 

Rural localities in Sharansky District